Mendionde (Basque Lekorne) is a small village and a commune in the Pyrénées-Atlantiques department in south-western France. It is part of the traditional Basque province of Labourd.

See also
Communes of the Pyrénées-Atlantiques department

References

Communes of Pyrénées-Atlantiques
Pyrénées-Atlantiques communes articles needing translation from French Wikipedia